Bluegreen Corporation is an American private vacation ownership company based in Boca Raton, Florida. Currently a wholly owned subsidiary of BFC Financial Corporation with around 4,500 employees, the company provides vacations at 60 company-managed resorts on a time-share basis, with alternative resort and cruise options available through upselling and third-party exchanges. Bluegreen makes its services available to other resort operators on a fee-for-service basis.

Originally a land-sale company founded as Patten Realty Corporation in 1966, Bluegreen also developed land into residential and golf course communities until 2012. The company currently has three primary divisions: Bluegreen Resorts oversees the time-share program, Bluegreen Vacations manages the Bluegreen Vacation Club point system, and Outdoor Traveler markets Bluegreen programs at Bass Pro stores.

Beyond Bass Pro, Bluegreen also has ongoing partnerships with companies such as Choice Hotels International. In 2012 Bluegreen's profits came to $458 million and total assets equaled to $1.08 billion. Bluegreen's philanthropic efforts include support of organizations such as the American Red Cross and JDRF.

History

Founding and early years (1966-1984)

Bluegreen Corporation was formed in Massachusetts in 1966 as Patten Realty. Founder Harry Patten had previously worked in sales at American Central, a developer of vacation home sites, and by 1964, he had saved enough to develop a single property himself. Purchasing a $15,000 parcel in rural Stamford, Vermont, Patten took on a partner and headquartered the business in the 25-room Stamford estate. Their original core business was regional in scope. Patten Realty would purchase large tracts of undeveloped or lightly developed land, usually with token down payments, from farmers unable to market it themselves. Then, they paid to have the land subdivided, and would resell the resulting 5- to 20-acre parcels to city dwellers as recreational or potential property.

Patten branched off as an independent developer after ten years, and in 1976, he incorporated the business as Patten Realty Corporation. In 1982, Patten Realty Corporation opened its first regional office branch in Portland, Maine. Annual sales increased more than tenfold, to $35 million, between 1981 and 1984 as Patten expanded outside the Northeast, and Patten was named by Fortune as one of 1985's “50 Most Fascinating Business People.”

IPO and move to Florida (1985-1993)
Patten Realty Corporation went public with an initial public offering in November 1985, and in 1986, it was listed on the New York Stock Exchange as Patten Corporation, or Patten Corp. By January 1986, Patten Corp. was "the biggest gainer on the New York Stock Exchange," after its stock prices quadrupled in one year. With branches in fifteen states by early 1986, by the end of 1986, Patten Corp. remained the third fastest-growing company on the exchange. From the midpoints of fiscal 1986 through 1987, profits increased 175%, and Patten Corp. had total assets totaling $324 million by March 1988, as compared to $14 million four years earlier. Debt also increased in that time to help finance land purchases from 1987 and 1988. By the end of 1988, Patten Realty's annual revenue equaled $120 million, with net earnings of $15.1 million. In the late 1980s the company faced a bout of bad publicity over allegedly deceptive marketing, with several New England states opening investigations into the company's sales practices. While denying any wrongdoing, in 1989, Patten settled with New York, Vermont, Massachusetts, Maine, and New Hampshire by agreeing to refund consumers "who could prove they were deceived" on issues such as lease details.

Patten Corp. experienced $45 million in losses in 1989 and 1990, with stock value dipping before rebounding again. Patten Realty was profiled on 60 Minutes in March 1991. That year the company relocated its headquarters to Boca Raton, Florida, with a number of staff remaining in Vermont. The company was profitable within six months of the move. Around that time Patten continued to restructure the business to improve cash flow, and in the early 1990s Patten Corp. sold holdings in the northeast United States to focus on the midwest and southeast. Patten Corp. furthermore worked on cutting its debt load, and by 1994 it had seen its stock value improve significantly since the dip in 1991.

Change to Bluegreen Corporation (1993-1999)

George F. Donovan was named president and chief operating officer in 1993, and later that year he took on Patten's role as CEO. Patten would resign as chairman and sell his remaining 8% stake in Patten Corp. in late 1994. Donovan, who had a background in both timeshares and golf community development, reorganized the company into land, timeshare and home sale divisions, forming the Bluegreen Resorts and Bluegreen Communities divisions in 1994. That year Patten Corp. purchased land in Gatlinburg, Tennessee to develop its first timeshare, MountainLoft.  In August 1995, Patten Corp. opened a second resort bordering Great Smoky Mountains National Park, and the following month the company acquired land in North Myrtle Beach, South Carolina, for a third resort and first oceanfront property, which opened in 1996. The company was renamed Bluegreen Corporation in February 1996.

Bluegreen acquired RDI Group in 1997 for $7.5 million, which was a private "vacation ownership developer and operator of a points-based vacation club." Through RDI, Bluegreen acquired resorts in Florida and Wisconsin, as well as "management contracts with resorts across the Southeast." The Bluegreen Vacation Club was formed as a direct result. Bluegreen opened its first daily fee golf course in 1997, designed by Fred Couples and located in North Carolina. Bluegreen Communities then sold lots around the golf course to homeowners, heralding a new business model for Bluegreen that the company also extended to other developments. That year, the company recorded sales of US$115.9 million. In 1998, Bluegreen expanded into Aruba, and the following year, Bluegreen entered the "urban timeshare market" by acquiring an inn in South Carolina. In 1999, the company had record net profits of $17 million and overall sales of $257.7 million.

Partnerships (2000-2011)
In 2000, Bluegreen established a cross-industry marketing agreement with Bass Pro, also marketing its Bluegreen Wilderness Club franchise through the Bass Pro subsidiary Big Cedar. Bluegreen subsequently formed an alliance with Boyne USA Resorts in 2002, also opening two more golf courses that year, one designed by Curtis Strange and one by Davis Love III. Later in 2002, Bluegreen acquired TakeMeOnVacation, L.L.C., a company which generated sales leads. TakeMeOnVacation's software systems were reworked for Bluegreen Direct, a newly formed direct marketing business unit. After BankAtlantic Bankcorp in Fort Lauderdale acquired a 40 percent interest in Bluegreen in 2002, in 2003 Bluegreen expanded into Montana and Michigan, with annual sales reaching US$438 million. The following year sales totaled US$600 million, while by 2005 Bluegreen had revenues of US$684.2 million and 4,076 employees.

Bluegreen had two primary divisions as of 2005. Bluegreen Communities marketed and sold housing units in upscale markets, while Bluegreen Resorts was involved with the resort timeshare business with the Bluegreen Vacation Club brand. In 2005, Forbes ranked Bluegreen No. 57 on its 200 Best Small Companies list. Bluegreen opened its first resort in Las Vegas in 2006. Donovan retired as Bluegreen President and CEO at the end of that year, and was succeeded by John M. Maloney, Jr. Since 2009, Bluegreen has made its development, management, sales and marketing, title, mortgage and financial services available to other resort operators on a fee-for-service basis.

Return to private ownership (2012-2016)
In May 2012, Bluegreen sold its Bluegreen Communities division to Dallas-based SouthStar Development Partners for $29 million, with Southstar also acquiring several of Bluegreen's residential neighborhoods. As a result of selling its community division, Bluegreen became a pure-play company for the first time since 1994. Diamond Resorts attempted to purchase Bluegreen for $197 million in June 2012, which Bluegreen refused. That year Bluegreen reported total revenues of $457.7 million and income from continuing operations of $54.3 million. Equity equaled $349 million and total assets equaled $1.08 billion.

In 2013 Bluegreen formed an alliance with Choice Hotels International, and on April 2, 2013, Bluegreen merged with Woodbridge Holdings, a subsidiary of BFC Financial Corporation and BBX Capital Corporation. Immediately prior to the merger, BFC Financial had, through additional transactions, come to own 53% of Bluegreen. As such, Bluegreen became a wholly owned subsidiary of BFC Financial Corporation. Continuing to focus on its time-share business model, by the spring of 2013, Bluegreen had "over 60 owned or managed resorts, and access to more than 4,000 resorts and other vacation experiences such as cruises and hotel stays worldwide."

Business model 
Originally a land-sale company focused on reselling rural plots of around 200 acres or more, Bluegreen until 2012 developed the land it purchased into residential and golf course communities, marketing home sites within the tracts directly to consumers. Later branching into resorts and timeshares, the company is also known as an industry pioneer in the practice of offering fee-based services. Bluegreen's core business is currently the marketing, selling and servicing of vacation ownership interests (VOIs) known collectively as the Bluegreen Vacation Club. Under Bluegreen's vacation program, customers buy vacation points as compared to a specific property. However, they are still considered "owners" on a legal basis because they purchase an interest in a company resort held in their trust. Under the system, customers can plan stays at various timeshare resorts operated by Bluegreen or its corporate partners in North America, particularly along the Gulf Coast. With the point system, owners can also stay at several thousand affiliated resorts overseas, and vacation points can be traded, sold, or rented to others.  As of 2013, the company provided vacations to around 170,000 users in the form of stays at company-managed resorts (more than 60) plus hotel, resort and cruise options available through upselling and third-party exchanges.

Current subsidiaries

Philanthropy
Bluegreen supports national charities including Christel House International, JDRF (formerly Juvenile Diabetes Research Foundation), Cystic Fibrosis Foundation and the American Red Cross, and regional and local charities such as Florida-based Deliver the Dream. The company also adopts 12 charities every year for support as Charity of the Month and allows employees to use two paid workdays per year volunteering for charitable organizations. Bluegreen has been corporate sponsor for the JRDF Walk to Cure event in Boca Raton annually since 2006. In 2013, the company exceeded its $50,000 goal and raised the 15th highest amount of any corporate team participating in the more than 100 events across the United States.

Resort locations

The Caribbean

United States

See also

List of top employers in Boca Raton, Florida
Real estate
Resort fee

References

External links 

 
Bluegreen Vacations Company website
Bluegreen Getaways Package Sales 
Bluegreen owner Owner Servicing 
Book Bluegreen Vacations Guest Servicing

Real estate companies of the United States
Companies based in Boca Raton, Florida
Real estate companies established in 1966
Timeshare chains
Companies listed on the New York Stock Exchange
2017 initial public offerings
1966 establishments in the United States
1966 establishments in Florida